Patal Bhuvaneshwar (Hindi पाताल भुवनेश्वर) is a limestone cave temple 14 km from Gangolihat in the Pithoragarh district of Uttarakhand state in India. It is located in the village of Bhubneshwar. Legend and folklore have it that this cave enshrines Lord Shiva and thirty three koti demigods [33 types and not crore]. The cave is 160 m long and 90 feet deep from the point of entrance. Limestone rock formations have created various spectacular stalactite and stalagmite figures of various hues and forms. This cave has a narrow tunnel-like opening which leads to a number of caves. The cave is fully electrically illuminated.
Built by the flow of water, Patal Bhuvaneshwar is not just one cave, rather a series of caves within caves.

"He who wants to feel the presence of eternal power should come to the sacred Bhuvneshwar situated near the confluence of Ramganga, Sarayu and Gupt-Ganga." 
-Manaskhanda, Skanda Purana, whose 800 verses refer to Patal Bhuvaneshwar

Legend Of the Cave
The first human to discover this cave was Raja Ritupurna who was a king in the Surya Dynasty (Surya Vansha) who was ruling Ayodhya (from the time of Rama) during the Treta Yuga. The story starts with Ritupurna and King Nala. It is said that once, King Nala was defeated by his wife, Queen Damayanti. In order to escape his wife’s prison Nala requested Ritupurna to hide him. Ritupurna took him to the forests of the Himalayas and asked him to stay there. While going back home he was fascinated by a deer which ran into woods and went after it. He could not find it and took rest under a tree. He had a dream where the deer was asking Ritupurna not to chase him.  His sleep broke and as he woke up and went to a cave where a guard was standing. After enquiring about the cave he was allowed to go inside. Right at the entrance, Ritupurna met Sheshnag who agreed to take him through the cave. It carried him on its hood. He saw the marvels of Gods taking place inside. He saw all the 33-koti (33 gods not 33 crore) gods and goddesses including Lord Shiva himself. It is said that after his visit, the cave was closed for ages with a slight prediction in the Skanda Purana that it will be reopened again in Kali Yuga. In the Kali Yuga, Adi Shankaracharya, during his visit to Himalayas re-discovered this cave. Since then regular worship and offering are being done at this place.

History
According to belief, King Rituparna of the Sun dynasty (Surya Vansha) discovered the cave in the Treta Yuga. In the Kali Yuga, Adi Shankaracharya visited this cave in 1191 AD. That was the beginning of the modern pilgrimage history, at Patal Bhuvaneshwar. The journey inside the cave has to be carried in feeble lights, holding protective iron chains. The Stone formations of Sheshnag can be seen, holding the earth, heaven and the underworld. ‘Havan’ (fire sacrifice) is performed in a dimly lit, solemn atmosphere, under the spell of holy chants. You’ll also be impressed by the visit as these parts form the celestial heights of Shiva's abode in Mount Kailash. The cave, it is believed, is connected by an underground route to Mount Kailash.
It is believed that the Pandavas and their wife Draupadi, the heroes of the Mahabharata, proceeded towards their last journey in the Himalayas after meditating here, in front of Lord Shiva. This hidden pilgrimage situated at 1,350 m above sea level is mainly dedicated to Lord Shiva. Almost every god that you would have heard of resides in this mystifying cave. It is also believed that you can worship at Patal Bhuvaneshwar is equivalent to worshipping the Chota Char Dham of Uttarakhand.

The priest family, the Bhandaris are performing religious rites at Patal Bhuvaneshwar since the time of Adi Shankaracharya. More than 20 generations in the line. They are a treasure house of legends, lores, anecdotes and information about this holy place. It is also believed that this cave is internally connected to the four abodes /seats (Char Dham).
According to one belief, the original human head of lord Ganesha which was cut down by lord Shiva, is situated here who creates obstacles for bad people to improve. This form of Ganesha is popularly known as Vighnaharta. The head is now not recognisable as it is covered in a layer of limestone with an 8-petaled lotus-like formation (Brahma-Kamala) on top.

Inscription outside the Temple

"This awesome cave is believed to be as old as the earth itself. It has been mentioned in detail in the 103 chapter of Manaskhand of "Skanda Purana". The first human who entered this cave was king "Rituparna" of Surya Dynasty during the Treta Yuga. It is said that during his visit, he had encountered several demons and "Sheshnaag" himself acted as his guide. One can see the gateway of the great ages in Patal Bhuvaneshwar. There are four entrances inside the cave named as ‘Randwar (Door of War)’ ‘Paapdwar (Door of Sin)’, ‘Dharmdwar (Door of Dharma) ’ and ‘Mokshadwar (Door of Moksha (liberation)’. The Paapdwar, literally the Door of Sin, was closed soon after the death of Ravana in the war of Lanka and the Randwar, literally, the Door of War, was closed down after the great Mahabharata War at Kurukshetra. At present only two gateways are opened (The Dharmdwar and Mokshadwar gates). You can see the tongue of Goddess Kali, Airavata of Indra, hair of Lord Shiva and several other wonders inside the caves of Patal Bhuvaneshwar.

In the Dvapara Yuga this cave was rediscovered by the Pandavas. In the Kali Yuga, Adi Shankaracharya consecrated this cave temple and since 1191, this has been a place of visit, both for sightseeing and worship."

Places to visit
The motorable road ends half a kilometer away from the cave entrance. You have to descend nearly 100 steps into this narrow cave, to reach the sanctum sanctorum, which gives an overwhelming feeling that you’re entering the centre of the earth.

Each stone, each stalagmite within each cave or doorway, in magnificent erection reveals the story of Hindu pantheon in the shapes of Gods, Goddesses, saints and known mythological characters.

The naturally formed places to visit in Patal Bhuvaneshwar are :-
 Ganesha's human head.
 Kali's tongue
 Shiva's hair.
 A naturally formed (Swayambhu) Shiva Lingam.
 Replica idols of Amarnath, Kedarnath and Badrinath. (Badrinath and Kedarnath are part of the Char Dham pilgrimage circuit).
 Swan idol (symbolises the swan of Brahma and Saraswati).
 Legs of an elephant (symbolises the elephant vehicle Airavata)
 A large man-made pond (kund) filled with water.
 A sculpture of the Kali Yuga.
 8 petaled lotus formation (symbolises a flower called Brahma-Kamala or "Heavenly Lotus").

Places to stay
Patal Bhuvaneshwar has emerged as an interesting area for tourists to visit and in the vicinity of the caves there are a few small hotels available for staying. Good Indian food and also Kumauni food is available there. The distance of Haat Kalika Temple
from Patal Bhubaneshwar is only 13 kms, which can be completed in 30 minutes in 35 km. Haat Kalika is the ancient temple of Maa Bhagwati. After visiting the caves one has an option to move to nearby other towns also namely Berinag and Chaukori. From these places a picturesque view of Himalaya can be seen. Patal Bhuvaneshwar is quite reachable by tri junction of Seraghat and again can be connected to another sacred pilgrim  Jageshwar Dham directly via Seraghat-Naini motor road. Jageshwar can be covered via visiting small villages like Dhankhet, Salla Bhatkot, Nali, Kunj Kimola etc places in between on the bank of beautiful river Sarayu.

References

External links 
 , The Hindu, 23 May 2003
 Patal Bhuvaneshwar
  on map
 Patal Bhuvaneshwar

Hill stations in Uttarakhand
Tourist attractions in Uttarakhand
Hindu cave temples in India
Limestone caves
Show caves in India
Pithoragarh
Caves of Uttarakhand